This list of biofluid mechanics research groups gives an overview of academic research organisations in the field.

References 

Research groups